Michael Wright (January 7, 1980 – November 10, 2015) was an American-Turkish professional basketball player. He also held Turkish citizenship. His Turkish name was Ali Karadeniz. He played professional basketball in Poland, Spain, Israel, South Korea, France, Germany, and Turkey. He was murdered in 2015.

High school career
Wright played his high school basketball at Farragut Academy, where, as a freshman, he was part of one of the best teams in the country, which boasted future professionals Willie Farley and Ronnie Fields, as well as Minnesota Timberwolves superstar Kevin Garnett. At 2.03 m (6 ft 8 in), Wright played center after Garnett's departure, and moved to power forward in college.

College career
At the University of Arizona, Wright started for the Wildcats in the 2001 NCAA Division I championship against the Duke Blue Devils. However, undersized for that position at the pro level, and too slow to be a small forward,he dropped to the second round of the 2001 NBA draft where he was drafted by the New York Knicks.

Professional career
Wright was drafted as the 39th pick in the 2001 NBA draft by the New York Knicks. After not joining the Knicks or any other NBA team, Wright moved overseas and switched teams almost every season. He was one of 8 players selected in the 2001 NBA Draft who never played in a single NBA game.

Wright started with Polish league champions Śląsk Wrocław, that also participated in the Euroleague, moving to Spain's CB Granada the following year.

After the team was relegated to the LEB (Spain's second division), Wright moved to Israel and signed with Hapoel Tel Aviv. A year later he signed with ALBA Berlin.

In 2005, he moved to Beşiktaş Cola Turka of the Turkish Basketball League. He started the 2006–07 season in South Korea with Jeonju KCC Egis; in October signed with French and Euroleague's EB Pau Orthez.

In May 2007, he moved back to Turkey and signed for Türk Telekom B.K. In September 2009 he has signed a contract with Turów Zgorzelec from Poland for the 2009–10 season.

In July 2011, he returned to Türk Telekom B.K. for one season with an option for a second one. In the summer of 2012, he signed a contract with Mersin BB.

On February 3, 2015, he signed with Cholet Basket of the French LNB Pro A. After averaging 1.7 points and 2 rebounds in 3 contests, Wright and Cholet parted ways.

Murder
On November 10, 2015, Wright was found dead in his car in Brooklyn, New York, covered in trash bags in the vehicle's back seat. The medical examiner determined that his death was a homicide. Two men were charged in his death.

According to a family member interviewed after his death, Wright intended to return to Europe to play another two seasons before retirement.

Two men were charged on November 1, 2016 – Mark A. Holdbrooks, 59, and alleged accomplice David Victor, 35, were charged with murder and other offenses after a yearlong investigation. Holdbrooks, Wright's longtime roommate, allegedly reported him missing on November 8, 2015. Bergen County Prosecutor Gurbir S. Grewal did not specify a motive or mention how Wright was killed but said he had suffered "head trauma." Later, authorities said Victor and Holdbrooks drugged Wright with gamma hydroxybutyrate (GHB), a date rape drug, and killed  him with an axe in Closter, New Jersey, and that Victor then drove Wright's Lexus SUV to Brooklyn, leaving it with his body in it parked on East 16th Street near Avenue J in Midwood.

References

External links
College stats
NBA Draft profile
Eurobasket.com profile
ACB profile 
TBLStat.net Profile
Euroleague & Eurocup Profile

1980 births
2015 deaths
African-American basketball players
Alba Berlin players
All-American college men's basketball players
American emigrants to Turkey
American expatriate basketball people in France
American expatriate basketball people in Germany
American expatriate basketball people in Israel
American expatriate basketball people in Poland
American expatriate basketball people in South Korea
American expatriate basketball people in Spain
American expatriate basketball people in Turkey
American men's basketball players
Arizona Wildcats men's basketball players
Basketball players from Chicago
Beşiktaş men's basketball players
CB Granada players
Cholet Basket players
Élan Béarnais players
Farragut Career Academy alumni
Hapoel Tel Aviv B.C. players
Israeli Basketball Premier League players
Jeonju KCC Egis players
Liga ACB players
Mersin Büyükşehir Belediyesi S.K. players
Naturalized citizens of Turkey
New York Knicks draft picks
Power forwards (basketball)
Śląsk Wrocław basketball players
Türk Telekom B.K. players
Turkish men's basketball players
Turkish people of African-American descent
Turów Zgorzelec players
People murdered in New York City
Male murder victims
20th-century African-American people
21st-century African-American sportspeople